1986 is Taiwanese Mandopop artist Genie Chuo's debut Mandarin studio album. It was released on 27 July 2001 by Rock Records. It is available with a power CD. Chuo debuted with this album at 15 years of age and there was a hiatus of 5 years, with the exception of a few soundtrack contributions, before her second album Be Used To in 2006.

Track listing
 Introduction
 "C.P.Z" (Crazy Party Zoo)
 Interlude 1
 "我怎麼知道" (How Do You Know) – China Television (CTV) Ikkyū (一修和尚) ending theme
 Interlude 2
 "我做不到" (I Can't Do It)
 Interlude 3
 "Hala"
 Interlude 4
 "怎麼辦" (What To Do)
 "想家" (Homesick)
 Interlude 5
 "感受" (Feeling)
 "我喜歡這樣的愛" (Like This Love)
 Interlude 6
 "I L U"
 Interlude 7
 "Goodbye"

Power CD
 Summer Genie's card 
 Magic school grounds 
 Genie's talk
 Welcome to Genie's world

References

External links
  Genie International Club by Rock Records

2001 debut albums
Genie Chuo albums
Mandarin-language albums
Rock Records albums